Norwegian Automobile Federation (NAF) is a Norwegian association of car owners, established in 1924, and member of Fédération Internationale de l'Automobile. The federation has 73 local chapters and more than 500,000 members. NAF is running a number of test stations, skidpans and camping sites. Among its publications is the monthly magazine Motor and the triannual NAF Veibok.

References

External link 
 

1924 establishments in Norway
Organizations established in 1924
Automobile associations
Transport organisations based in Norway